Expressome may refer to:
A supramolecular complex consisting of RNA polymerase and a trailing ribosome linked by a shared mRNA. The expressome complex mediates a mechanism of gene expression regulation termed transcription-translation coupling.
The whole set of gene expression in a cell, tissue, organ, organisms, and species. Expressome is a slightly larger concept than transcriptome. The transcriptome is the set of transcripts, while expressome includes transcripts, proteins and other ligands (abundance or concentration).

See also
 Bioinformatics
 DNA microarray
 Gel electrophoresis
 Mass spectrometry
 Protein sequencing
 Systems biology
 Expressomics
 List of omics topics in biology

External links 
 Bioinformatics Journal

Gene expression

References